The Bloc Québécois (BQ) fielded seventy-five candidates in the 2000 Canadian federal election, covering all ridings in the province of Quebec. Thirty-eight of these candidates were elected, allowing the party to retain its position as the third-largest grouping in the House of Commons of Canada.

Candidates

See also
Results of the Canadian federal election, 2000

References

2000
Candidates in the 2000 Canadian federal election